
Gmina Nowy Wiśnicz is an urban-rural gmina (administrative district) in Bochnia County, Lesser Poland Voivodeship, in southern Poland.

The gmina contains part of the protected area called Wiśnicz-Lipnica Landscape Park.

Villages
Apart from the town of Nowy Wiśnicz, Gmina Nowy Wiśnicz contains the villages and settlements of Chronów, Kobyle, Kopaliny, Królówka, Leksandrowa, Łomna, Muchówka, Olchawa, Połom Duży, Stary Wiśnicz and Wiśnicz Mały.

Neighbouring gminas
Gmina Nowy Wiśnicz is bordered by the town of Bochnia and by the gminas of Bochnia, Brzesko, Gnojnik, Lipnica Murowana, Trzciana and Żegocina.

References
Polish official population figures 2006

Nowy Wisnicz
Bochnia County